Fred L. Muhl (April 3, 1880 – October 23, 1954) was an American football, basketball and baseball coach. He served as the head football (1906, 1909–1920}, head men's basketball (1910–1921) and head baseball (1926) coach at Illinois Wesleyan University.

References

1880 births
1954 deaths
American football quarterbacks
Illinois Fighting Illini football players
Illinois Wesleyan Titans football coaches
Illinois Wesleyan Titans men's basketball coaches
Illinois Wesleyan Titans baseball coaches
Players of American football from Illinois
Sportspeople from Bloomington, Illinois